The Achilles company built scooters and mopeds in West Germany between 1953 and 1957. The moped was powered by a 48cc engine, while the scooters were powered by 98cc and 123cc Sachs engines. When the factory closed down, the British Norman Cycles firm purchased the production equipment to manufacture their own moped.

References

External links
 48cc Sports model

Motorcycle manufacturers of Germany